APRC may refer to:

 Asia-Pacific Rally Championship
 Annual percentage rate of charge, a measure of interest rates
 Alien Permanent Resident Certificate, a resident identification card in China and Taiwan
 Alliance for Patriotic Reorientation and Construction, a political party in the Gambia